Niedermirsberg Castle, also called the Steinhaus ("Stone House"), is a levelled motte castle which is situated 780 metres west of the village church of Niedermirsberg, in the borough of Ebermannstadt in the county of Forchheim in the south German state of Bavaria.

Of the former motte nothing has survived above ground.

Literature 
 
 Hellmut Kunstmann: Die Burgen der südwestlichen Fränkischen Schweiz. Verlag Degener & Co., 1990.

See also 
 List of German motte and bailey castles

External links 
 

Castles in Bavaria
Ebermannstadt
Motte-and-bailey castles